Minneola, California may refer to:
Minneola, former name of Clotho, California
Minneola, former name of Ivesta, California